Roland Reisley House was built in Pleasantville, New York in 1951. The third of the "Usonia Homes" (now known as the Usonia Historic District) designed by Frank Lloyd Wright. this is a building on a hillside with a masonry "core" and wood siding. Roland Reisley was 26 when he built his home. The entrance is dominated by a dramatic wood cantilevered carport, which leads to an impressive yet unpresumptuous low-slung house with cypress paneling and indigenous stone.

Wright returned five years later to design a  addition.

Usonia Homes was listed on the National Register of Historic Places in 2012.

References
 Storrer, William Allin. The Frank Lloyd Wright Companion. University Of Chicago Press, 2006,  (S.318)

External links
 Reisley House Pleasantville New York by Frank Lloyd Wright
 Photos on Arcaid
 Plan to Protect Water Called a Threat to Trees April 16, 2009 NY Times article

Frank Lloyd Wright buildings
Houses in Westchester County, New York
Houses completed in 1951